The following is a list of Balkan Bulgarian Airlines destinations. Balkan Airlines was Bulgaria's government-owned flag carrier between 1947 and 2002.

Africa
Algeria
Algiers – Houari Boumediene Airport
Egypt
Cairo – Cairo International Airport
Ghana
Accra – Kotoka Airport
Kenya
Nairobi – Jomo Kenyatta Airport
Libya
Benghazi – Benina International Airport
Tripoli – Tripoli Airport
Morocco
Casablanca – Mohammed V Airport
Nigeria
Lagos – Murtala Muhammed Airport
South Africa
Johannesburg – OR Tambo International Airport
Sudan
Khartoum – Khartoum Airport
Tunisia
Tunis – Tunis–Carthage Airport
Zimbabwe
Harare – Harare Airport

Asia
India
Kolkata – Netaji Subhash Chandra Bose Airport
Indonesia
Jakarta – Soekarno–Hatta International Airport
Malaysia
Kuala Lumpur – Sultan Abdul Aziz Shah Airport
Maldives
Malé – Ibrahim Nasir Airport
Sri Lanka
Colombo – Bandaranaike Airport
Taiwan
Taipei – Taoyuan International Airport
Thailand
Bangkok – Don Mueang Airport

West Asia

Bahrain
Bahrain – Bahrain International Airport
Israel
Tel Aviv – Ben Gurion International Airport
Kuwait
Kuwait City – Kuwait International Airport
Lebanon
Beirut – Beirut Rafic Hariri Airport
Oman
Muscat – Muscat Airport
Qatar
Doha – Doha International Airport
Syria
Damascus – Damascus Airport
UAE
Abu Dhabi – Abu Dhabi International Airport
Dubai – Dubai International Airport

Europe
Austria
Vienna – Vienna Airport
Belgium
Brussels – Brussels Airport
Bulgaria
Bourgas – Bourgas Airport
Sofia – Sofia Airport
Varna – Varna Airport
Croatia
Split – Split Airport
Cyprus
Larnaca – Larnaca Airport
Czech Republic
Prague – Ruzyně Airport
Denmark
Copenhagen – Copenhagen Airport
Finland
Helsinki – Vantaa Airport
France
Paris – Charles de Gaulle Airport
Germany
Berlin – Schönefeld Airport
Frankfurt – Frankfurt Airport
Munich – Franz Josef Strauss Airport
Greece
Athens – Ellinikon Airport
Hungary
Budapest – Ferenc Liszt Airport
Italy
Milan – Malpensa Airport
Rome – Leonardo da Vinci Airport
Malta
Malta – Malta Airport
Netherlands
Amsterdam – Schiphol Airport
Poland
Warsaw – Chopin Airport
Portugal
Lisbon – Portela Airport
Russia
Moscow – Sheremetyevo Airport
Saint Petersburg – Pulkovo Airport
Serbia
Belgrade – Belgrade Airport
Spain
Madrid – Barajas Airport
Sweden
Stockholm – Arlanda Airport
Switzerland
Zurich – Zurich Airport
Turkey
Istanbul – Istanbul Airport
Ukraine
Kyiv – Boryspil Airport
United Kingdom
London – Heathrow Airport
Birmingham – Birmingham Airport
Manchester – Manchester Airport

North America
USA
New York – John F. Kennedy International Airport

South America
Brazil
Rio de Janeiro – Galeão/Antonio Carlos Jobim International Airport

Balkan Bulgarian Airlines